Harry von Meter (March 20, 1871 – June 2, 1956; sometimes credited Harry van Meter) was an American silent film actor. He starred in about 200 films in the period from 1912 through 1929. He retired from acting just as sound films were beginning.

Born in Malta Bend, Missouri, von Meter was signed by the Thanhouser Company based in New Rochelle, New York in 1912, moving to American Film Studios a year or two later.  He appeared in the 1923 film The Hunchback of Notre Dame as Monsignor Neufchatel. 

He died in Sawtelle, Los Angeles, California in 1956, at age 85.

Filmography

1912
 Maud Muller
 The Power of Melody
 The Half-Breed's Way
 The Belle of Bar-Z Ranch
 The Bandit of Tropico

1913
 Rose of San Juan
 The Haunted House
 The Idol of Bonanza Camp
 The Oath of Pierre
 The Proof of the Man 
 The Snake
 A Forest Romance 
 For the Peace of Bear Valley
 Justice of the Wild
 In the Mountains of Virginia
 Calamity Anne's Dream
 At Midnight
 The Occult 
 American Born
 Trapped in a Forest Fire
 Personal Magnetism

1914
 Destinies Fulfilled
 The Power of Light
 The Son of Thomas Gray
 A Blowout at Santa Banana  
 True Western Hearts
 The Cricket on the Hearth
 The Crucible
 The Call of the Traumerei
 A Story of Little Italy
 The Coming of the Padres 
 The Certainty of Man 
 A Happy Coersion
 The Last Supper 
 The Widow's Investment
 David Gray's Estate 
 The Story of the Olive
 The Navy Aviator
 Beyond the City 
 The Lost Sermon 
 Metamorphosis
 Sparrow of the Circus
 The Unmasking
 Nature's Touch 
 The Cameo of the Yellowstone
 Feast and Famine
 A Man's Way
 Business Versus Love
 Does It End Right? 
 The Trap
 Their Worldly Goods
 The Aftermath
 Break, Break, Break
 The Cocoon and the Butterfly
 His Faith in Humanity
 Billy's Rival
 Jail Birds
 In the Open
 Sweet and Low
 Sir Galahad of Twilight
 Redbird Wins
 Old Enough to Be Her Grandpa
 In the Candlelight
 The Strength o' Ten
 The Sower Reaps

1915
 The Unseen Vengeance 
 A Golden Rainbow
 The Black Ghost Bandit 
 The Legend Beautiful 
 Refining Fires
 Coals of Fire 
 The Law of the Wilds
 A Heart of Gold
 The Wily Chaperon
 In the Twilight
 She Never Knew
 Heart of Flame
 The Echo
 The Two Sentences
 Competition
 In the Heart of the Woods .... Ben Morgan
 In the Sunlight 
 A Touch of Love 
 She Walketh Alone 
 The Poet of the Peaks
 When Empty Hearts Are Filled
 The Altar of Ambition
 At the Edge of Things 
 The Right to Happiness
 A Woman Scorned
 The Honor of the District Attorney
 After the Storm
 The Great Question
 Pardoned
 The End of the Road
 The Buzzard's Shadow

1916
 The Other Side of the Door
 The Secret Wire
 The Gamble
 The Man in the Sombrero
 The Broken Cross
 The White Rosette ... Baron Edward/Pierpont Carewe
 Lillo of the Sulu Seas
 True Nobility .... Lord Devlin
 April .... Tim Fagan
 The Release of Dan Forbes
 The Abandonment .... Benson Heath
 The Fate of the Dolphin
 Dust .... John D. Moore
 Youth's Endearing Charm .... John Disbrow
 Dulcie's Adventure  .... Jonas
 The Undertow .... John Morden
 The Love Hermit .... James Bolton
 Lone Star .... John Mattes

1917
 Beloved Rogues .... Andrews
 My Fighting Gentleman .... Judge Pembroke
 Whose Wife? .... Claude Varden
 Captain Kiddo  .... Mr. Cross
 Princess Virtue .... Count Oudoff

1918
 A Man's Man .... Ricardo Ruey
 Broadway Love .... Jack Chalvey
 The Kaiser, the Beast of Berlin .... Capt. von Hancke
 The Lion's Claws .... Capt. Bogart
 Midnight Madness (as Harry Van Meter) .... Aaron Molitor
 The Dream Lady .... James Mattison
 His Birthright .... Adm. von Krug
 The Lure of Luxury .... Philip Leswing
 The Man of Bronze .... Trovio Valdez
 The Cabaret Girl (as Harry Van Meter) .... Balvini

1919
 Diane of the Green Van .... Baron Tregar
 The Day She Paid (as Harry Van Meter) .... Leon Kessler
 A Gun Fightin' Gentleman (as Harry Meter) .... Earl of Jollywell
 A Man's Fight .... Jarvis
 The Challenge of Chance (as Harry Van Meter) .... El Capitan
 A Rogue's Romance (as Harry Van Meter) .... Leon Voliere
 The Girl with No Regrets .... Geralld Marbury

1920s
 The Lone Hand (1920) (as Harry Von Meter) .... Joe Rollins
 Dollar for Dollar (1920) (as Harry Van Meter) .... Victor Mordant
 The Cheater (1920) (as Harry Van Meter) .... Bill Tozeer
 Alias Miss Dodd (1920) (as Harry Van Meter) .... Jerry Dodd
 Under Crimson Skies (1920) (as Harry van Meter) .... Vance Clayton
 The Unfortunate Sex (1920) (as Harry Van Meter) .... James Harrington
 Dangerous Love (1920) .... Gerald Lorimer
 Reputation (1921) (as Harry Van Meter) .... Monty Edwards
 The Beautiful Gambler (1921) (as Harry Van Meter) .... Lee Kirk
 The Heart of the North (1921) .... De Brac
 Judge Her Not (1921) .... Rob Ferris
 A Guilty Conscience (1921) (as Harry Van Meteer) .... Vincent Chalmers
 Life's Greatest Question (1921) (as Harry Van Meter) .... Julio Cumberland
 When Romance Rides (1922) .... Bill Cordts
 Putting It Over (1922) (as Harry Van Meter) .... Mark Durkham
 Wildcat Jordan (1922) (as Harry Van Meter) .... Roger Gale
 My Dad (1922) .... The Factor
 The Broadway Madonna (1922) (as Harry Van Meter) .... Dr. Kramer
 Speed King (1923) .... Randolph D'Henri
 Nobody's Bride (1923) .... Morgan
 A Man's Man (1923) .... Ricardo Ruey (*see 1918 film with this title)
 The Hunchback of Notre Dame (1923) (as Harry Van Meter) .... Mons. Neufchatel
 The Breathless Moment (1924) (as Harry Van Meter) .... Tricks Kennedy
 Sagebrush Gospel (1924) .... Linyard Lawton
 Great Diamond Mystery (1924) .... Murdock
 The Cloud Rider (1925) .... Juan Lascelles
 The Texas Bearcat (1925) .... John Crawford
 Triple Action (1925) .... Eric Prang
 The Flying Mail (1926) (as Harry Van Meter) .... Bart Sheldon
 Kid Boots (1926) (as Harry Van Meter) .... Eleanor's lawyer
 Hour of Reckoning (1927) 
 Border Romance (1929) .... Captain of Rurales

External links

 

1871 births
1956 deaths
People from Saline County, Missouri
Male actors from Missouri
American male film actors
American male silent film actors
20th-century American male actors